Flyte may refer to:

 Flyte, a children's novel by Angie Sage
 Flyte (chocolate bar),  chocolate bar by Mars, Incorporated
 Flyte (band), an English indie-pop band
 FLYTE, earlier name of American boy band later known as Midnight Red
 The aristocratic family in Brideshead Revisited

See also
 Flyting, a contest of exchanged insults, often in verse